, also known as My Bridge Through Space and Time, is a 2010 Japanese anime film. It is the 18th film based on the popular comedy manga and anime series Crayon Shin-chan. This movie was released in India on 28 September 2013 on Hungama TV as Shin Chan The Movie Villain aur Dulhan.

Plot
In the future, a grown-up Shin-chan is turned to stone by his to-be fiancé (Tamiko Kaneari)'s father. Distressed by Shin-chan's fate, she travels to the past via a time machine in order to get 5-year old Shin-chan to help her save his adult self. In the present, Shin-chan & his friends (Kazama, Nene, Masao and Bo) are discussing their ambition, Tamiko arrives and takes them to the future.

Once their, they get separated from Tamiko and seek refuge at Shin-chan's old house. There, they meet an older Hiroshi (who has gone bald) and Misae (affected with Metabolic Syndrome). Despite their changed appearance, they still maintain their kind nature. They explain to young Shin-chan and his friends that the crashing of a huge meteorite ceased sunlight to reach the Earth as Kaneari (Tamako's father) and his company took over Japan.

The next "morning", Shin-chan and his friends head out to locate Tamiko and along the way, they encounter the adult versions of Masao and Nene, who are far more rougher and fiercer but still maintain a kind heart. Meanwhile, Kaneari confronts his daughter and forces her to marry adult Kazama (a successful Businessman) in order to maintain his image and get a huge amount of money from Kazama's company.

As the wedding takes place, Shin-chan is deeply angered and accuses Tamiko of betraying him. Determined to save adult Shin-chan, Tamiko escapes the wedding as Kazama refuses to marry Tamiko. Adult Bo-chan suddenly arrives and reveals himself to be a scientist. The young and adult Kasukabe Defense Force (alongside old Hiroshi & Misae) aid Tamiko in her endeavors as the general public turns against Kaneari. Angered by all of this, Kaneari takes control of a super-sized robot and attempts to destroy the stoned adult Shin-chan.

Bo brings his own robot, titled "Tetsujin Bo-chan No. 28" along with adult Himawari (now member of the Police). In the middle of all the chaos, Tamiko and Shin-chan go to rescue adult Shin-chan. Something which they succeed in only after great effort. As adult Shin-chan is restored to his original state, sunlight falls once again in Japan as Shin-chan discovers that his adult version hasn't changed much.

As Shin-chan and his friends return to the present, Shin-chan is relieved to see his parents in their original state.

Characters
Adult Shinnosuke / Adult Shinchan  : Future self of the Shinnosuke Nohara, His fiance/Wife is Tamiko. Tamiko told about his fiance's/Husband personality as: "friendly but not straightforward". He was captured by Masuzo Kaneari in Action Kamen costume. To regain the light of the sun, He climbed to the top of the tower. He was trying to bring the sunshine back to the earth using the power of his own, and its purpose is as simple as "to see a beautiful lady in a swim-wear in a warm climate", His personality is not changed at all although he has a soft side for his Wife but still behaves to her bit childish.
Tamiko Kaneari / Tamiko Nohara: She is Shinnosuke 's Fiancé or Wife from future, She hates her father because of his personality. She appeared in front of 5 year old Shinnosuke and his friends in the Futaba Park using Time Machine. She asked his cooperation with her. She told to him that her Husband Future Shinnosuke asked her to call his 5 year old himself to rescue him from the trap set up by Masuzo Kaneari. Tamiko explained her to fall in love in Shinnosuke's reason fell in love because he is silent and nice, gave her his seat in a crowded train and treated her with ice cream. She told to Shinnosuke's friends "I would love to have  opportunity to have fun with Shinnosuke together" which explains her deep love with him
Adult Kazama: Future self of Toru Kazama. He employees under the guidance of Tamiko's father in  electrical elite gold. He was instructed to marry Tamiko by Masuzo, Tamiko's father. Later he was fired because he went against Masuzo Kaneari's words. Then, he went to help Shinnosuke.
Adult Nene: Nene Sakurada of the future. The usual first person is "Ashi". She is a teacher at Futaba Kindergarten, where the number of children has decreased. She has a bad tone and attitude, and has a habit of making private phone calls while cleaning the garden. However, when she rushed to Shinnosuke with Masao Sato in the future, where she returned and told Nene, 5 years old, "Remember that reality is much more miserable than real play house. ".
She looks exactly like her mother, Moeko Sakurada. Unlike the current Nene, her personality is rough, probably because she knew the harshness of reality, but she is also able to show calm and realistic thinking
Adult Masao: Masao Sato of the future. He is characterized by being fat and growing hair. He works as a part-time clerk at a convenience store, but since no customers come to the store, he reads magazines and writes boring manga. A manga called "Masked Massao W" was serialized, but it was discontinued in three weeks. His personality seems to be different from when he was a child, and he is more rough than Nene. However, the goodness of the roots is not lost, and when he rushes to Shinnosuke at the end of the game, he returns to his childhood tone and personality.
Adult Bo: Future Bo-chan. His hair is long, he wears glasses and his runny nose has disappeared.
He is the only inventor in the Kasukabe Defense Force who truly fulfilled his dreams and is also developing combat robots such as "Tetsujin Bo-chan No. 28". His expression is richer than when he was a boy, but his habit of saying "Bo" and his easygoing personality remain the same.
Masuzo Kaneari:
Tamiko's father and Shinchan's Father - in - law and ruler of the future city of Neo Tokio. The president of Kinyu Denki manages all the electricity in the city. In addition to electricity, he also runs an amusement park. He is aiming for Tamiko and 5-year-old Shinnosuke by catching the future Shinnosuke who opposes himself. Subordinates who do not obey themselves and branch offices that do not make money are immediately cut off, and even Tamiko, her real daughter, has almost no feelings as a father as she thinks he only see her as a product.
Kinyu Denki still exists today and is a program sponsor of "Action Kamen." It used to be just one company, but in the future when the sun was lost, the power of Kinyu Denki, which produces electricity, became enormous, and it came to dominate Neo Tokio.  In the latter half of the story, he brought back Tamiko and tried to marry her to the future Kazama with the life of the future Shinnosuke as a shield, but the invasion of the 5-year-old Shinnosuke and the future Kazama rebelled against Kinyu. The plan failed. After that, he controlled the giant robot "Home Appliance Robo X" and confronted Shinnosuke and others, but was defeated. After the turmoil, he was arrested by an adult Himawari who was employed by the International Police.
Old Hiroshi and Old Misae: Hiroshi Nohara and Misae Nohara of the future will continue to live at home in the future. Futaba Shoji, where Hiroshi worked, has been crushed by Kinyu Denki.
Hiroshi's head is quite thin and bald, and Misae has a metabolic syndrome and is fat, but her personality has not changed in particular and she helps Shinnosuke who came from the past.
In addition, both of them have the same attractive personality, Hiroshi owns a wig and Misae owns a slim bodysuit, and which lied, "You can regain youth and confidence by wearing it." Hiroshi's strong sock odor hasn't changed after 20 years, and Misae said, "Anyone who can't stand this odor isn't eligible to get married."
Adult Himawari: Future self of Himawari Nohara. She rushed to rescue her brother. Aside from occasional contact with her parents, Misae and Hiroshi, she lives independently. She is working for the International Police Force of Neo-Tokyo, She has grown into an fine lady with her naturally curly hair and bangs and  always active. She features a double tooth. She rides Motorcycle and wears a helmet which looks like her childhood toy's head gifted by her friend Shinko-chan.
Shiro's children: Shirota, Shirokichi, Shiroko, Shirobi, Shirotaro, Shirojiro, Shiromaru, Sirone, Sirone, Shirot: Shiro's children in future, they look similar to Shiro.

Cast
Akiko Yajima - Shin-chan , Tamiko's Fiance/Husband in the Series.
Keiji Fujiwara - Hiroshi
Miki Narahashi - Misae
Satomi Kōrogi - Himawari
Rie Kugimiya - Tamiko Kaneari/Tamiko Nohara , Shinchan's Fiance/Wife in the Series.
Kenji Utsumi - Masuzo Kaneari , Tamiko's father and Shinchan's Father - in law in the Series.
Nobutoshi Canna - Adult Shinnosuke/Shinchan , Tamiko's Husband.

References

External links
 
 

2010 anime films
2010s Japanese-language films
Super-Dimension! The Storm Called My Bride